Neurotrophin-3 is a protein that in humans is encoded by the NTF3 gene.

The protein encoded by this gene, NT-3, is a neurotrophic factor in the NGF (Nerve Growth Factor) family of neurotrophins. It is a protein growth factor which has activity on certain neurons of the peripheral and central nervous system; it helps to support the survival and differentiation of existing neurons, and encourages the growth and differentiation of new neurons and synapses. NT-3 was the third neurotrophic factor to be characterized, after nerve growth factor (NGF) and BDNF (Brain Derived Neurotrophic Factor).

Function
Although the vast majority of neurons in the mammalian brain are formed prenatally, parts of the adult brain retain the ability to grow new neurons from neural stem cells; a process known as neurogenesis. Neurotrophins are chemicals that help to stimulate and control neurogenesis.

NT-3 is unique in the number of neurons it can potentially stimulate, given its ability to activate two of the receptor tyrosine kinase neurotrophin receptors (TrkC and TrkB).

Mice born without the ability to make NT-3 have loss of proprioceptive and subsets of mechanoreceptive sensory neurons.

Mechanism of action
NT-3 binds three receptors on the surface of cells which are capable of responding to this growth factor:

 TrkC (pronounced "Track C"), is apparently the "physiologic" receptor, in that it binds with greatest affinity to NT-3.
 However, NT-3 is capable of binding and signaling through a TrkC-related receptors called TrkB.
 Finally, NT-3 also binds a second-receptor type besides Trk receptors, called  the LNGFR (for "low affinity nerve growth factor receptor).

High affinity receptors
TrkC is a receptor tyrosine kinase (meaning it mediates its actions by causing the addition of phosphate molecules on certain tyrosines in the cell, activating cellular signaling).

As mentioned above, there are other related Trk receptors, TrkA and TrkB.  Also as mentioned, there are other neurotrophic factors structurally related to NT-3:  
 NGF (for "Nerve Growth Factor")
 BDNF (for "Brain Derived Neurotrophic Factor")
 NT-4 (for "Neurotrophin-4")

While TrkB mediates the effects of BDNF, NT-4, and NT-3,   TrkA binds and is activated by NGF, and TrkC binds and is activated only by NT-3.

Low affinity receptors
The other NT-3 receptor, the LNGFR, plays a somewhat less clear role.  Some researchers have shown the LNGFR binds and serves as a "sink" for neurotrophins.

The crystal structure of NT-3 shows that NT-3 forms a central homodimer around which two glycosylated p75 LNGFR molecules bind symmetrically. The symmetrical binding takes place along the NT-3 interfaces, resulting in a 2:2 ligand-receptor cluster in the center.

Cells which express both the LNGFR and the Trk receptors might therefore have a greater activity – since they have a higher "microconcentration" of the neurotrophin.

It has also been shown, however, that the LNGFR may signal a cell to die via apoptosis – so therefore cells  expressing the LNGFR in the absence of Trk receptors may die rather than live in the presence of a neurotrophin.

See also
 Tropomyosin receptor kinase B § Agonists

References

Further reading

Neurotrophic factors
Peptide hormones
Growth factors
Developmental neuroscience
Proteins
TrkB agonists